Crawfordville is an unincorporated community and county seat of Wakulla County, Florida, United States.

Demographics

2020 census

As of the 2020 United States census, there were 4,853 people, 1,729 households, and 1,046 families residing in the CDP.

Notable people
Cecil H. Bolton, Medal of Honor recipient, was born in Crawfordville.
Nigel Bradham, Philadelphia Eagles linebacker
Feleipe Franks, quarterback and tight end for the Atlanta Falcons
Alvin Hall, Financial advisor and media personality

Notes

County seats in Florida
Unincorporated communities in Wakulla County, Florida
Tallahassee metropolitan area
Unincorporated communities in Florida
Census-designated places in Florida